Viktor Aksonov (born 26 July 1941) is a Soviet athlete. He competed in the men's javelin throw at the 1964 Summer Olympics.

References

1941 births
Living people
Athletes (track and field) at the 1964 Summer Olympics
Soviet male javelin throwers
Olympic athletes of the Soviet Union
Sportspeople from Kharkiv